Who Wants to Beat Up a Millionaire? is a  video game parody of Who Wants to Be a Millionaire?. It was created by Hypnotix, and released in 2000 by Simon & Schuster Interactive for Microsoft Windows and Sega Dreamcast.

While the Microsoft Windows versions feature mainly 2D-animation and menus, the Dreamcast version mainly uses 3D models for the player, as well as 3D environments and the millionaires the player beats up in 3D, rather than 2D animation in the PC version.

Gameplay
The objective of the game is to answer multiple-choice questions correctly, by using a buzzer to answer. Following this, the player assaults another player's character. The objective of the game is to assault another player sufficiently so that they drop off the game's ladder, a parody of the real show's question ladder. The last player is the winner.

Lifeboats
Like its more serious (and non-violent) real-life counterpart, Who Wants to Beat Up a Millionaire? gives the contestants "lifelines" (also known in-game as "lifeboats") to help them out if they get stumped. The three lifeboats are: 
One or the other: Eliminates two incorrect answers, analogous to the 50:50 lifeline on the real game show. 
Pass the buck and chicken out: Give the question to another contestant or swap the question out for a new one, analogous to the Switch the Question lifeline on the original show. 
Fortune cookie: Gives the player a hint.

Characters
Egregious Philin, host and parody of Regis Philbin
Sheik Abdul Chickpea, a Middle Eastern oil magnate
Daisey Mae LePlume, a parody of Anna Nicole Smith
Rich Littleweasel III, a generic trust fund kid
Melvin Dotcom, a parody of Bill Gates
Ronald Hump, a parody of Donald Trump

Reception

IGN rated the game 5.7 (Mediocre) for lack of replayability.

References

External links
Hypnotix Inc. page
Who Wants to Beat Up a Millionaire on IMDB

2000 video games
Dreamcast games
Parody video games
Quiz video games
North America-exclusive video games
Cultural depictions of Bill Gates
Parodies of Donald Trump
Video games based on game shows
Video games developed in the United States
Who Wants to Be a Millionaire?
Windows games
Simon & Schuster Interactive games
Multiplayer and single-player video games